Vera Ellen Wang (born June 27, 1949) is an American fashion designer.

Early life 
Vera Ellen Wang was born June 27, 1949, in New York City to Chinese parents who emigrated to the United States in the mid-1940s. Her mother, Florence Wu (Wu Chifang), worked as a translator for the United Nations, while her father, Cheng Ching Wang (Wang Chengqing), a graduate of Yanjing University and MIT, owned a medicine company. Wang has one brother, Kenneth.

Wang began figure skating at the age of eight, training under Peter Dunfield and Sonya Klopfer in Denver during the summers and with the Skating Club of New York during the rest of the year. While in high school, she trained with pairs partner James Stuart, and competed at the 1968 U.S. Figure Skating Championships. She was featured in Sports Illustrated Faces in the Crowd in the January 9, 1968 issue. When she failed to make the U.S. Olympics team, she entered the fashion industry. Wang continues to enjoy skating, saying, "Skating is multidimensional".

Wang attended Friends Seminary, graduated from Chapin School in 1967, attended the University of Paris, and earned a degree in art history from Sarah Lawrence College. 

In 1968, Wang was presented as a debutante to high society at the International Debutante Ball at the Waldorf Astoria New York.

Career
Wang was hired to be an editor at Vogue immediately upon graduation from Sarah Lawrence College, making her the youngest editor at that magazine. She stayed at Vogue for 17 years, leaving in 1987 to join Ralph Lauren, for whom she worked for two years. At 40, she resigned and became an independent bridal wear designer.

Wang has made wedding gowns for public figures such as Hayley Williams, Ariana Grande, Chelsea Clinton, Karenna Gore, Ivanka Trump, Campbell Brown, Alicia Keys, Mariah Carey, Victoria Beckham, Sarah Michelle Gellar, Avril Lavigne, Hilary Duff, Khloe Kardashian, and Kim Kardashian. Wang started off as being  best known for her elegant wedding dresses. Wang's evening wear has also been worn by Michelle Obama.

Figure skaters who have worn costumes designed by Wang at the Winter Olympic Games include Nancy Kerrigan (1992 and 1994), Michelle Kwan (1998 and 2002), Evan Lysacek (2010), and Nathan Chen (2018 and 2022). Wang was inducted into the U.S. Figure Skating Hall of Fame in 2009 for her contribution to the sport as a costume designer. She designed the uniforms worn by the Philadelphia Eagles Cheerleaders.

On October 23, 2001, her book Vera Wang on Weddings was released. In June 2005, she won the Council of Fashion Designers of America (CFDA) Womenswear Designer of the Year.  On May 27, 2006, Wang was awarded the André Leon Talley Lifetime Achievement Award from the Savannah College of Art and Design.

Wang's evening wear has been worn by stars at many red carpet events, including Viola Davis at the 2012 Academy Awards, and Sofia Vergara at the 65th Emmy Awards.

She was awarded the Council of Fashion Designers of America Lifetime Achievement Award in 2013.

In 2006, Wang reached a deal with Kohl's, a chain of department stores, to produce a less expensive line of ready-to-wear clothing exclusively for them called Simply Vera.

Forbes placed her the 34th in the list America's Richest Self-Made Women 2018, her revenues rising to $630 million in that year.

On September 10, 2019, after a sabbatical of 2 years during which she had presented her collections only via films, Vera Wang returned to the New York Fashion Week runway for her Spring/Summer 2020 fashion show, which celebrated the 30th anniversary of her brand. The show received very positive reviews, with Godfrey Deeny describing it as a "notable collection by one of the few New York designers with a truly distinctive fashion DNA", while Bridget Foley presented Wang's creations as "Beautiful, seriously designed clothes, presented with gutsy panache". However, the show was marred by several major footwear malfunctions, especially during the finale when four models fell down, including Fei Fei Sun, who fell twice in a row, leading chief fashion critic Vanessa Friedman to state that "In 2019, no woman should be tortured by what she wears".

Retail
In 1990, she opened her own design salon in the Carlyle Hotel in New York City that features her trademark bridal gowns. She has since opened bridal boutiques in New York, London, Tokyo, and Sydney and has also expanded her brand through her fragrance, jewelry, eyewear, shoes, and homeware collections.

"White by Vera Wang" launched on February 11, 2011, at David's Bridal. Prices of the bridal gowns range from $600 to $1,400. In 2002, Wang began to enter the home fashion industry and launched The Vera Wang China and Crystal Collection, followed by the 2007 release of her diffusion line called Simply Vera, which are sold exclusively by Kohl's.

In spring 2012, Wang teamed up with Men's Wearhouse to offer two tuxedo styles available in both the retail and rental areas of their inventory.
In June 2012, she expanded in Australia with the opening of "Vera Wang Bride Sydney" and her first Asian flagship store "Vera Wang Bridal Korea", helmed by President Jung Mi-ri, in upmarket neighborhood Cheongdam-dong in Gangnam-gu, Seoul.

In a 2013 interview with CBS, Wang described her transition from journalist to businesswoman as "painful, and not only that, I have no choice. So I think when you start there's a certain innocence because of that freedom, and as you evolve you begin to see the parameters of what you can and can't do. So I make decisions that are very tiny that will affect an hour of work, I make decisions that will impact the lives of the people that work for me. It's in fashion as well, micro work, a centimeter of proportion and then it's macro to see what a vision is on the red carpet."

Personal life 
In June 1989, Wang married investor Arthur P. Becker in an interfaith Baptist and Jewish ceremony. They have two daughters, both of whom were adopted. In July 2012, the couple announced their separation.

In popular culture
Several movies and television shows have featured Wang's works.

In a third season episode of the TV series The West Wing, entitled 'The Black Vera Wang', an evening gown by Wang is pivotal to a storyline involving threats made against the White House Press Secretary, C. J. Cregg. In the other TV series The Newsroom also written by Aaron Sorkin, Mac also talked about wearing dresses made by Vera Wang for her wedding ceremony.

In the TV series Gossip Girl, Blair Waldorf wore a Vera Wang wedding dress. Wang appeared in a cameo in season 5 episode 11.

In the TV series Sex and the City, Charlotte York found Wang's wedding dress to be the perfect wedding dress and wore it for her wedding to Trey MacDougal.

In the film Sex and the City, Vera Wang was among the bridal gowns Carrie Bradshaw wore in her Vogue photo shoot. In the film Bride Wars, Anne Hathaway and Kate Hudson wore custom-made Vera Wang gowns.

Also in Revenge, Victoria Grayson, played by Madeleine Stowe, wears a steel gray Vera Wang mermaid gown in her second wedding with Conrad Grayson (Henry Czerny). The dress was actually shown in black at Wang's Fall 2012 show.

In The Simpsons episode, "My Big Fat Geek Wedding", Nelson Muntz refuses to egg Edna Krabappel with a canola oil balloon per Bart Simpsons' orders as she runs out on her wedding to Seymour Skinner, because her dress is a Vera Wang. He eggs Skinner with it instead after he chases after her.

Filmography

Movies
 First Daughter (2004) as herself.
 The September Issue (2009) as herself.

Television
 Gossip Girl (2012) as herself.
 Keeping Up with the Kardashians  (2011) as herself.
 Chelsea Lately  (2011) as herself.
 The Celebrity Apprentice (2008) as herself.
 Ugly Betty  (2007) as herself.

Books
 Vera Wang, Vera Wang on Weddings, HarperCollins, October 2001.

Recognition
She was recognized as one of the BBC's 100 women of 2021.

References

External links 

 
 
 

1949 births
American debutantes
American designers
American fashion businesspeople
American fashion designers of Chinese descent
American fashion designers
Businesspeople from New York City
Chapin School (Manhattan) alumni
Clothing brands of the United States
Debutantes of the International Debutante Ball
Dinnerware designers
High fashion brands
Living people
Luxury brands
Sarah Lawrence College alumni
University of Paris alumni
Wedding dress designers
American women company founders
American company founders
American women fashion designers
Friends Seminary alumni
BBC 100 Women